The 2001 AFL Grand Final was an Australian rules football game contested between the Essendon Bombers and the Brisbane Lions, held at the Melbourne Cricket Ground in Melbourne on 29 September 2001. It was the 105th annual grand final of the Australian Football League (formerly the Victorian Football League), staged to determine the premiers for the 2001 AFL season. The match, attended by 91,482 spectators, was won by Brisbane by a margin of 26 points, marking the club's first premiership since it was established in 1997.

Background
Essendon were defending their 2000 premiership, and went into the game having finished on top of the ladder on percentage ahead of second placed Brisbane (both had won 17 games). Brisbane had won fifteen consecutive games leading up to the grand final, a streak which commenced with a major upset of Essendon at the Gabba in Round 10. It was the Brisbane Lions' first appearance in a grand final, and it broke a long grand final drought for the two clubs who merged to form it in 1997: its Melbourne-based predecessor, Fitzroy Lions, had not contested a grand final since 1944, and its Brisbane-based predecessor Brisbane Bears did not contest a grand final in its ten-year history. Essendon were the dominant team between 1999 and 2001, losing just 11 games (including just one in 2000) from the start of 1999 until the 2001 grand final.

In the 2001 finals series, Essendon defeated Richmond by 70 points in the first qualifying final and then defeated Hawthorn by 9 points in the first preliminary final to advance to the grand final. Brisbane earned their place in the grand final by defeating  by 32 points in the second qualifying final and then Richmond by 68 points in the second preliminary final.

In the lead-up to the match, Brisbane's Jason Akermanis won the Brownlow Medal. The two coaches, Kevin Sheedy and Leigh Matthews, had met in a grand final 11 years prior, when Matthews' Magpies ended their so-called "Colliwobbles" (a drought lasting 32 years) by defeating Sheedy's Bombers in the 1990 AFL Grand Final.

This was the last AFL match to be televised by the Seven Network before it lost the broadcasting TV rights to the sport, having shown the game for the previous 45 years, with the exception of 1987, when the game was televised by the ABC and TV0 in Brisbane. It wasn't until 2007 that Seven would regain the rights, and it wasn't until 2008 that the AFL Grand Final would again be televised by the Seven Network.

Match summary
Brisbane started the game well, scoring the first goal of the match from a free kick awarded to Alastair Lynch for holding against Dustin Fletcher. Essendon fought back late in the first quarter then took control of the game in the second term. Brisbane's poor kicking for goal almost put them out of the game in the second quarter as Essendon blew their lead out to 20 points late in the term. Brisbane had kicked an inaccurate 5.10 by the half-time break.

Brisbane managed to overrun Essendon in the third term kicking six goals to one and turning a 14-point deficit into a 16-point lead. Brisbane's pace in the midfield and the tiring legs of most of the Essendon players played a pivotal role in Brisbane taking full control of the game in the second half, to win comfortably. Essendon had scored two late goals in the last quarter after once trailing by as much as 39 points.

Shaun Hart of the Lions was awarded the Norm Smith Medal for being judged the best player. Matthew Lloyd was amongst the best for Essendon, kicking 5 goals.

Essendon captain James Hird was visibly shattered and disappointed in his post-match speech. A quick congratulations to Brisbane for winning was followed by a public apology to Bombers fans for letting them down.

In a remarkable statistic, most of the Lions' premiership side were on the playing list when the club won the wooden spoon in 1998.

This was the first of four consecutive grand final appearances by Brisbane, and the first of three consecutive flags. For Essendon, this is their most recent grand final appearance as of 2022.

Teams

Scorecard

Legacy 
Chris Scott (twice) and Hardwick (three times) have coached their clubs to premierships — in 2011 and 2022 (Scott), and 2017, 2019 and 2020 (Hardwick) — with Leppitsch acting as an assistant to the latter in all three flags; additionally, both coached against each other in the 2020 Grand Final, which was played at the Gabba.

See also 
2001 AFL season

References

AFL Grand Final
VFL/AFL Grand Finals
Brisbane Lions
Essendon Football Club
AFL Grand Final
September 2001 sports events in Australia